Moses is an opera by Myroslav Skoryk, based on the 1905 poem of the same name by Ivan Franko. The libretto is by the composer and Bogdan Stelmakh. The opera is divided into two acts and five scenes, with a prologue and epilogue. It was first performed at the Lviv Theatre of Opera and Ballet on 20 May 2001, to coincide with the visit of Pope John Paul II to Ukraine (23-27 June 2001).

Roles

Synopsis
Franko's poem was conceived as an allegory of the Ukrainian people, which he saw as having great potential but weakened by political division. The poem, based on the Moses of the Bible, sees Moses, after forty years leading the Children of Israel in the desert, under attack from a revolt by Dathan and Abiram. Moses leaves the camp to meditate; in his absence, the Israelites worship the Golden Calf. In the desert, Moses is tempted by an evil spirit, Azazel, and also by the ghost of his mother Jochebed, who seek to get him to renounce God (Jehovah). Jehovah creates a storm in which Moses is swept away. The Israelites immediately panic and condemn Dathan and Abiram to death. Joshua prepares to lead them to the Promised Land.

The prologue and epilogue of the original poem are an address by the poet to the Ukrainian people, making the parallels of the story explicit. They are retained in shortened form in the opera. The only significant story-line change in the opera is to introduce Joshua and his wife Liya (who does not appear at all in the poem) early in the story as defenders of Moses against Dathan and Abiram.

References

Operas
2001 operas
Ukrainian-language operas
Operas based on the Bible
Cultural depictions of Moses
Operas by Myroslav Skoryk